Gábor Sztankó (born 18 January 1985) is a retired Hungarian professional footballer who last played for Egri FC.

Club honours

Egri FC 
Hungarian National Championship II:
Winner: 2011–12

Career statistics

External links
 HLSZ 

1985 births
Living people
People from Vác
Hungarian footballers
Association football goalkeepers
Kecskeméti TE players
Vác FC players
Egri FC players
Sportspeople from Pest County